Gidgee may refer to any of a number of species of Acacia native to arid or semi-arid regions of Australia, or to the vegetation communities in which these species dominate:

 Most commonly Acacia cambagei
 Acacia argyrodendron, commonly known as "Black Gidgee"
 Acacia anastema, commonly known as "Sanddune dometrius" or just "Gidgee"
 Acacia crombiei, commonly known as pink gidgee.
 Acacia pruinocarpa, commonly known as "Gidgee" or "Black Gidgee"
 Acacia subtessarogona, commonly known as "Spreading Gidgee"
 Acacia georginae, commonly known as "Georgina Gidgee"

Other uses
 Gidgee Gold Mine, a gold mine in Western Australia